(born May 28, 1989) is a Japanese singer who debuted at the age of 13 in January 2003 in Japan and Taiwan.

Early life and education
Born and raised in Osaka, Hayashi became a performer after her piano teacher sent a tape of her singing to a music producer.

Career
Impressed with Hayashi's talent, a representative of Toshiba Emi's Southeast Asia division arranged to release her debut single, "ake-kaze", on the same day as its Japanese release.

Her debut album, called , was released on the same day in Japan, Taiwan, Hong Kong and Mainland China. She has gained fans throughout Japan, Hong Kong, Taiwan, and the United States.

Her hit song, titled "Chiisaki Mono" or "Make a Wish" (English Version), was used in the sixth Pokémon movie, Jirachi Wishmaker (Japanese: Nanayo no Negai Boshi; literally "Wishing Star of Seven Nights").  Other notable songs include "Hitotsubu no Tane ~Love the Earth~", "Snowdrop", "Jibun Shinjite" and "Mou Ichido Anata ni Aitai".

Hayashi has since recorded in both Japanese and Chinese, collaborating with Chinese instrumentalist Chen Min on the single, "Tsubane ni Naritai".

Personal life
In 2013, she married judo champion Satoshi Ishii. They have 1 son. The couple later divorced.

Discography

Albums
 [2003.03.21] Saku (咲; Bloom)
 [2004.07.14] Hatsukoi (初戀; First Love)
 [2005.12.14] Chou (蝶; Butterfly)
[2013.08.21] Golden Best (ゴールデン☆ベスト 林明日香)

Mini-Albums
 [2005.03.02] Tsunaide (つないで; Tie Together)

Singles
 [2003.01.22] ake-kaze (Dawn-Wind)
 [2003.03.19] "Haha" (「母」; "Mother")
 [2003.07.09] Chiisaki Mono / Tsubame ni Naritai (小さきもの/燕になりたい; Small Things / Like a Swallow)
 [2003.11.19] Mou Ichido Anata ni Aitai (もう一度あなたに会いたい; I Want to Meet You Again)
 [2003.12.17] Tsubame ni Naritai (Re-Release) (燕になりたい; I Want to Become a Swallow)
 [2004.03.03] Rin no Kuni (凛の国; Stern Country)
 [2004.06.30] SANCTUARY ~Yume no Shima e~ (SANCTUARY ~夢の島へ~; Going to the Dream Island)
 [2004.10.14] Kimi wa Magnolia no Hana no Gotoku / Sayonara wa Yuubae no Naka de (君はマグノリアの花の如く / さよならは夕映えの中で; You Are Like a Magnolia Flower / Goodbye is in the Sunset Glow)
 [2005.03.02] Renka (One Track First Press) (蓮花; Lotus Flower)
 [2005.05.25] Renka (蓮花; Lotus Flower)
 [2005.11.09] Koe (声; 'Voice)
 [2007.03.21] Kokoro no Mama ni (心のままに; Unchanging Heart)

DVD / VHS

 [2003.07.16] Chiisaki Mono (DVD Single) (小さきもの)
 [2003.09.19] Mou Ichido Anta ni Aitai (DVD single) (もう一度あなたに会いたい)

Compilation / Other

 [2004.05.19] Kikansha Sensei Original Soundtrack (SANCTUARY ~Yume no Shima e~)
 [2005.03.23] Van Son in Tokyo (DVD) (Rin no Kuni Sung Live; Titled "Dat Nuoc Lam Liet")
 [2005.03.30] VENUS JAPAN (Snowdrop)
 [2005.03.30] Minna no Uta Best Hit Collection (DVD) (Snowdrop)

References

External links
Asuca Hayashi's Official English Website: https://web.archive.org/web/20060824062956/http://www.asuca.jp/eng/news/main.html
Nippop Profile | Asuca Hayashi
Wiki.theppn Profile

1989 births
Living people
Musicians from Osaka
21st-century Japanese women singers
21st-century Japanese singers